Thyenillus is a monotypic genus of  jumping spiders containing the single species, Thyenillus fernandensis. It was first described by Eugène Louis Simon in 1910, and is found only on Bioko.

References

Monotypic Salticidae genera
Salticidae
Spiders of Africa